Mashhad Qoli (also Romanized as Mashhad Qolī; also known as Shahrak Maṭahar) is a village in Tus Rural District, in the Central District of Mashhad County, Razavi Khorasan Province, Iran. At the 2006 census, its population was 21,093, in 5,358 families.

References 

Populated places in Mashhad County